SmealSearch (now BizSeer) was a web portal, search engine and digital library for academic business documents that was originally hosted at the defunct eBusiness Research Center at the Pennsylvania State University. It was based on the CiteSeer digital library and search engine technology. Due to lack of support, it moved to the College of Information Sciences and Technology and became BizSeer. It was enhanced and modified by many including Lee Giles (project manager), Yang Sun (technical lead), Sandip Debnath, Isaac Councill, Arvind Rangaswamy, Nirmal Pal, Yves Petinot and Pradeep Teregowda.

BizSeer's goal was to intelligently crawl and harvest academic business documents on the web and use autonomous citation indexing to permit querying by citation or by document. Currently, it was publicly available on the World Wide Web at the College of Information Sciences and Technology at the Pennsylvania State University, and has over 150,000 documents, primarily in the fields of business, and related areas. The goal was to have the document collection continuously grow. BizSeer harvested business school information from the web and created a large database of business schools from around the world. BizSeer's goals were to assist students, professors, researchers and others with business related research and other information needs.

BizSeer, formerly SmealSearch, grew from and consumed a similar search engine, eBizSearch, designed to harvest and index academic documents related to e-business. Currently, BizSeer is no longer supported.

See also
CiteSeerX
CiteSeer
Citebase
Google Scholar
Scopus

Internet search engines
Online databases